Alberta Heart Institute may refer to:

 Libin Cardiovascular Institute of Alberta, Canada
 Mazankowski Alberta Heart Institute, Canada